Mario Mladenovski (born 16 September 2000) is a Macedonian footballer who plays as a centre-back for Shkupi and for the North Macedonia national team.

Club career
On 20 August 2020 it was confirmed, that Mladenovski had left FK Vardar to join Danish 1st Division club Fremad Amager, signing a deal until June 2023.

International career
Mladenovski made his international debut for North Macedonia on 16 November 2019 in a UEFA Euro 2020 qualifying match against Austria.

Career statistics

International

References

External links
 
 
 

2000 births
Living people
Footballers from Skopje
Macedonian footballers
Macedonian expatriate footballers
North Macedonia international footballers
Association football central defenders
FK Vardar players
Fremad Amager players
Botev Plovdiv players
Macedonian First Football League players
First Professional Football League (Bulgaria) players
Macedonian expatriate sportspeople in Denmark
Expatriate men's footballers in Denmark
Macedonian expatriate sportspeople in Bulgaria
Expatriate footballers in Bulgaria